Łaszczów is a town in Tomaszów Lubelski County, Lublin Voivodeship, in eastern Poland. It was re-established as a town on 1 January 2010, having previously had town status between 1549 and 1870. It is the seat of the gmina (administrative district) called Gmina Łaszczów.

The town has a population of 2,341.

The history of Łaszczów dates back to 1549, when King Zygmunt August allowed Podkomorzy of Belz and Castellan of Horodlo Aleksander Laszcz to change his own village of Domaniz into a town of Prawda (named after Prawdzic coat of arms). The royal bill was signed on December 22, 1549, at Piotrków Trybunalski.

The town of Prawda was founded next to the village. By the 1570s, its name was changed into Łaszczów (after the Laszcz family). Łaszczów had Magdeburg rights, and during the Protestant Reformation, became important center of the Polish Brethren. It had a prayer house and a printing shop, which operated until 1603. Łaszczów was a regional trade and business center, but its prosperity ended after Swedish invasion of Poland (1655–1660). In 1702, the town was burned by Swedes, during the Great Northern War, and in 1745, Jozef Laszcz, owner of Łaszczów, initiated construction of a church and Jesuit collegium. In 1754 Łaszczów burned in a great fire, after which its owners ordered residents to build brick houses.

Following the Partitions of Poland, Łaszczów became part of Russian-controlled Congress Poland. By 1902, its population grew to 2600, with Jews in the majority. In 1914, heavy Russian – Austrian fighting took place in the area, and in 1915, Austrians built narrow gauge railroad from Uhnow to Wlodzimierz Wolynski, via Łaszczów. 

During the Invasion of Poland by the Germans in World War II, Łaszczów saw Polish – German fighting. On December 25, 1942, the Germans murdered 75 residents of the town. The 1,500–2,500 Jews from the town were transported to the Belzec extermination camp on May 17, 1942. In June 1944, Łaszczów was burned by a band of the Ukrainian Insurgent Army.

References
Notes

Cities and towns in Lublin Voivodeship
Tomaszów Lubelski County
Kholm Governorate
Lublin Voivodeship (1919–1939)
Holocaust locations in Poland